SpanishDict is a Spanish-English reference and learning website and mobile application. The website and mobile application feature a Spanish-English dictionary and translator, verb conjugation tables, pronunciation videos, and language lessons. SpanishDict is managed by Curiosity Media.

SpanishDict was founded by Jeremy Cummings and Martha Cummings in 1999. Jeremy Cummings' brother, Chris Cummings, took over as CEO in 2007 while he was studying for a JD and MBA at Harvard University.

According to Fast Company, SpanishDict was being accessed by over 9 million users per month in 2013.  In 2014, the Washington Post reported that SpanishDict reached over 12 million users per month.  During the COVID-19 pandemic, SpanishDict and its accompanying product for English learners, inglés.com, reached over 100 million people annually. 

SpanishDict is often cited as a resource in academic journal articles in the fields of language acquisition and linguistics. 

In 2022, Curiosity Media was acquired by IXL Learning.

References 

Language learning video games
Spanish language in North America